New Mexico State Road 448 (NM 448) is a  state highway in Sandoval County and Bernalillo County, New Mexico. NM 448 is assigned as Coors Road inside of Albuquerque, and is assigned as Corrales Road in Corrales, New Mexico. The highway's northern terminus is at an intersection with NM 528 (Pat D'Arco Highway) in Rio Rancho. The highway then proceeds east then south through Corrales via Corrales Road. After leaving Corrales, it intersects with NM 528 again. The highway's southern terminus is at NM 45.

Route description
NM 448 begins at the three-way intersection between Coors Road, Coors Boulevard, and Coors By-Pass in northwestern Albuquerque, heading to the north-northeast on Coors Road. Shortly after intersecting NM 528 at Alameda Boulevard, the route crosses from Bernalillo County into Sandoval County, where it is known as Corrales Road. The route proceeds northeast through Corrales before turning to the northwest. It enters the city limits of Rio Rancho before coming to its northern terminus at the Pat D'Arco Highway (NM 528).

History
Until 2012, this route also included a portion of Coors Boulevard between St. Joseph's Drive and its current southern terminus at Coors By-Pass. This segment has since been replaced by NM 45, which now includes all of Coors Boulevard south of Coors By-Pass; the portion of Coors Boulevard between Old Coors Road and St. Joseph's Drive was previously locally maintained.

Major intersections

See also

 List of state roads in New Mexico

References

External links

448
Transportation in Bernalillo County, New Mexico
Transportation in Sandoval County, New Mexico
Transportation in Albuquerque, New Mexico
Rio Rancho, New Mexico